Bulbophyllum keralense is a species of orchid in the genus Bulbophyllum

References
The Bulbophyllum-Checklist
The Internet Orchid Species Photo Encyclopedia

keralense